Northcut is an unincorporated community in Washington County, in the U.S. state of Missouri.

History
A variant spelling was "Northcutt". A post office called Northcutt was established in 1912, and remained in operation until 1941. The community has the name of the local Northcutt family.

References

Unincorporated communities in Washington County, Missouri
Unincorporated communities in Missouri